The 2020 bwin World Series of Darts Finals was the sixth staging of the World Series of Darts Finals tournament, organised by the Professional Darts Corporation. The tournament took place at the Salzburgarena, Salzburg, Austria, from 18 to 20 September 2020, with smaller, masked, socially distanced crowds. It featured a field of 24 players.

Michael van Gerwen was the defending champion, having defeated Danny Noppert 11–2 in the 2019 final. However, he was beaten 6–4 in the second round by Glen Durrant.

Gerwyn Price won the tournament for the first time, his first World Series title, after beating Rob Cross 11–9 in the final.

Prize money
The prize money remained the same as the previous year.

Qualification
Due to the COVID-19 pandemic, no events were held on the World Series of Darts between the 2019 and 2020 finals. Instead of the standard rules of the top 8 players on the World Series Order of Merit being seeded, the PDC invited the eight top-ranked players in the PDC Order of Merit to make up the seeds. Twelve more players were invited unseeded (consisting of the next 4 players on the Order of Merit, plus players representing the regions of the world where the events were due to take place), with the final four players being determined by a qualifier for Tour Card holders held on 11 September at H+ Hotel, Niedernhausen, Germany.

Kyle Anderson was originally invited, but withdrew due to personal reasons. Glen Durrant replaced him. Gary Anderson was originally invited as the eighth seed, but also withdrew, with James Wade moving into the seeded places and Krzysztof Ratajski receiving an invitation.

The following players qualified for the tournament:

Draw

References

World Series of Darts
World Series of Darts
+2020
World Series of Darts Finals